Lieutenant General Sir William Thomas Furse,  (21 April 1865 – 31 May 1953) was a Master-General of the Ordnance.

Early life and education

Furse was born in Staines, Middlesex, the second son of the Ven. Charles Furse (born Johnson), Archdeacon of Westminster, and Jane Diana Monsell, second daughter of John Samuel Bewley Monsell, vicar of Egham. He was educated at Eton College and the Royal Military Academy, Woolwich. The artist Charles Wellington Furse and Rt. Rev. Michael Furse were his younger brothers.

Military career
Furse was commissioned into the Royal Artillery as a lieutenant on 5 July 1884. He was Aide-de-Camp to Lord Roberts from 1891 to 1893, and was promoted to captain on 30 May 1893.

He served during the Second Boer War as a Deputy Assistant Quartermaster General (D.A.Q.M.G.) at Army Headquarters, and was promoted to major on 15 March 1900. Following the end of the war in June 1902, Furse was on 15 October 1902 appointed D.A.Q.M.G. to the 2nd Army Corps based at Salisbury Plain. In 1911 he was appointed Commander 12th (Howitzer) Brigade Royal Field Artillery.

He served in World War I initially as a General Staff Officer on the British Expeditionary Force and then as General Officer Commanding 9th (Scottish) Division from 1915. He was made Master-General of the Ordnance in 1916; in this capacity he opposed the introduction of the Madsen machine gun, preferring the Lewis gun. He retired in 1920.

He was the father of the artist and designer Roger Furse and the actress Judith Furse.

References

|-
 

|-

1865 births
1953 deaths
People educated at Eton College
Graduates of the Royal Military Academy, Woolwich
British Army generals of World War I
Royal Artillery officers
People educated at Royal Grammar School, Guildford
Knights Commander of the Order of the Bath
Knights Commander of the Order of St Michael and St George
Companions of the Distinguished Service Order
British Army personnel of the Second Boer War
Military personnel from Middlesex
British Army lieutenant generals